The 2015–16 Central Coast Mariners FC season was the club's 11th season since its establishment in 2004. The club participated in the A-League for the 11th time and the FFA Cup for the 2nd time.

Review

Pre-season
The Mariners entered the 2015–16 season with significant change, following a relatively unsuccessful 2014–15 season. It was announced in April 2015 that Tony Walmsley would be given the permanent manager position, having previously filled the role in an interim capacity. Nick Montgomery was named club captain following the retirement of long-serving midfielder John Hutchinson in May 2015. There was also significant early activity in the transfer market, with a number of players released. The most notable of these was striker and club-record goalscorer Matt Simon. The club's first signing of the season was Irish former Premier League striker Roy O'Donovan. In July, after ten seasons with the club as a player, goalkeeping coach and assistant coach, John Crawley left the club to take up a position at Sydney FC. His position was taken by the retiring Matthew Nash, whose place in the squad was taken in turn by former Adelaide United and Young Socceroos goalkeeper Paul Izzo.

The Mariners won their opening pre-season friendly, a 2–1 victory over F3 Derby rivals Newcastle Jets in a training match. This was followed by a win over Western Sydney Wanderers two days later, with triallist Dan Heffernan scoring a hat-trick.

Central Coast were eliminated in the first round of the 2015 FFA Cup by Wellington Phoenix, an error from goalkeeper Paul Izzo and a missed penalty from Roy O'Donovan consigning the team to a 1–0 loss.

The club had a pre-season tour to Canberra in mid-August, which saw them pick up wins over Canberra Olympic and Gungahlin United.

October
The Mariners started the 2015–16 A-League season with a win over Perth Glory. After Roy O'Donovan scored the opening goal of the season from a rebound, two second-half penalties scored by Fábio Ferreira gave Central Coast a 3–2 win.

Players

Squad information

Transfers in

Transfers out

Club

Coaching staff

Other information

Statistics

Squad statistics

|-
|colspan="19"|Players no longer at the club:

Pre-season and friendlies

Competitions

Overall

A-League

League table

Results summary

Results by round

Matches

FFA Cup

References

External links
 Official Website

Central Coast Mariners
Central Coast Mariners FC seasons